Lee Ching-chung is a Taiwanese judoka. He completed in the 60 kg men's judo events at the 1996, 2000, and 2004 Summer Paralympics. Lee medaled twice, winning gold in 1996 and bronze in 2000.

References

Year of birth missing (living people)
Living people
Taiwanese male judoka
Judoka at the 1996 Summer Paralympics
Judoka at the 2000 Summer Paralympics
Judoka at the 2004 Summer Paralympics
Paralympic gold medalists for Chinese Taipei
Paralympic bronze medalists for Chinese Taipei
Medalists at the 1996 Summer Paralympics
Medalists at the 2000 Summer Paralympics
20th-century Taiwanese people
21st-century Taiwanese people